The discography of American musician Machine Gun Kelly consists of six studio albums, three extended plays (EPs), eight mixtapes, 32 singles (including eight as a featured artist) and 75 music videos. He claimed to have sold over 20 million records worldwide in an interview with The Breakfast Club, though the claim lacks veracity.

Studio albums

EPs

Mixtapes

Singles

As lead artist

As featured artist

Promotional singles

Other charted songs

Music videos

Guest appearances

Collaborative

Notes

References

Discographies of American artists
Hip hop discographies